Glionitrin A is an antibiotic-anticancer compound made by microbes found in an abandoned mine. The total synthesis of (−)-glionitrin A was reported by Daniel Strand and co-workers in 2021.

References

Nitro compounds
Organic disulfides
Nitrogen heterocycles
Sulfur heterocycles
Heterocyclic compounds with 4 rings